The .500 Maximum, also known as .500 Linebaugh Maximum and .500 Linebaugh Long, is a revolver cartridge developed by John Linebaugh. Only a small number of custom made 5-shot single action revolvers, such as the BMF .500 Maximum manufactured by Gary Reeder Custom Guns, the Ruger Bowen .500 Maximum manufactured by Bowen Classic Arms Corporation and revolvers manufactured by John Linebaugh or Jack Huntington, are being chambered for this round, with a barrel length of up to 6.5" with no muzzle brake or ports.

References

Pistol and rifle cartridges
Magnum pistol cartridges